Lawnton railway station is located on the North Coast line in Queensland, Australia. It serves the suburb of Lawnton in the Moreton Bay Region.

History
Lawnton station opened in 1888. In 2001, a third platform opened as part of the addition of a third track from Bald Hills to just north of the station.

As part of the Redcliffe Peninsula railway line project, the third track has been extended north to Petrie including a new bridge over the North Pine River.

Services
Lawnton is served by all City network services from Kippa-Ring to Central, many continuing to Springfield Central

Services by platform

Transport links
Thompsons Bus Service operates one route via Lawnton station:
669: Westfield Strathpine to Warner Village

References

External links

Lawnton station Queensland Rail
Lawnton station Queensland's Railways on the Internet

Railway stations in Australia opened in 1888
Shire of Pine Rivers
Railway stations in Moreton Bay Region
North Coast railway line, Queensland